Euryattus breviusculus, is a species of spider of the genus Euryattus. It is endemic to Sri Lanka.

References

Salticidae
Spiders of Asia
Endemic fauna of Sri Lanka
Spiders described in 1902